The 1910 Philadelphia Athletics season was their tenth as a franchise. The team finished first in the American League with a record of 102 wins and 48 losses, winning the pennant by 14½ games over the New York Highlanders. The A's then defeated the Chicago Cubs in the 1910 World Series 4 games to 1.

Regular season

Season standings

Record vs. opponents

Roster

Player stats

Batting

Starters by position 
Note: Pos = Position; G = Games played; AB = At bats; H = Hits; Avg. = Batting average; HR = Home runs; RBI = Runs batted in

Other batters 
Note: G = Games played; AB = At bats; H = Hits; Avg. = Batting average; HR = Home runs; RBI = Runs batted in

Pitching

Starting pitchers 
Note: G = Games pitched; IP = Innings pitched; W = Wins; L = Losses; ERA = Earned run average; SO = Strikeouts

Other pitchers 
Note: G = Games pitched; IP = Innings pitched; W = Wins; L = Losses; ERA = Earned run average; SO = Strikeouts

Cuban-American Major League Clubs Series 
The Athletics, as well as the Detroit Tigers, Habana club and the Almendares club, competed in the second Cuban-American Major League Clubs Series in 1910.

1910 World Series 

AL Philadelphia Athletics (4) vs. NL Chicago Cubs (1)

References

External links
1910 Philadelphia Athletics team page at Baseball Reference
1910 Philadelphia Athletics team page at www.baseball-almanac.com

Oakland Athletics seasons
Philadelphia Athletics season
American League champion seasons
World Series champion seasons
Oakland